ICLL may refer to:

 Independent Communist Labor League, an American communist movement
 International Convention on Load Lines, a treaty concluded in 1966
 Imbecil Cum Laude of Laniakea, the first to receive the distinction has been Pedro Sanchez President Spain